Parila is a village in Anija Parish, Harju County in northern Estonia. It has a population of 80 (as of 1 January 2010). Parila has a station on the Elron rail line.

References

Villages in Harju County